Wasit Governorate is a governorate in eastern Iraq, south-east of Baghdad and bordering Iran. Prior to 1976 it was known as Kut Province. Major cities include the capital Al-Kut, Al-Hai and Al-Suwaira. The governorate contains the Mesopotamian Marshes of Shuwayja, Al-Attariyah, and Hor Aldelmj. Its name comes from the Arabic word meaning "middle," as the former city of Wasit lay along the Tigris about midway between Baghdad and Basra. Wasit city was abandoned after the Tigris shifted course.

History

The ancient Sumerian city-state of Der is located near the town of Badra.

The governorate experienced heavy fighting in the Iran–Iraq War, specifically the Battle of the Marshes.

During the Iraq spring fighting of 2004, the Mahdi Army briefly took control of the capital Kut, from April 6 to April 16, before being defeated by US forces.

Demographics
The population is approximately 1,450,000. The majority are Shia Arabs. The marshes have traditionally been home to many Marsh Arabs. There are also Feyli Kurds in the eastern town of Badra.  A small Lurish community exists east of Kut.

As of 2007, the unemployment rate is 10% and the poverty rate 35%.

Provincial government
Governor: Malik Khalaf
Deputy Governor: Ahmed Abdu Salam

Districts

 Al-Aziziyah
 Badra
 Al-Hai
 Kut
 Numaniyah
 Suwaira

References

External links
Iraq Inter-Agency Information & Analysis Unit Reports, Maps and Assessments of Iraq's Governorates from the UN Inter-Agency Information & Analysis Unit

 
Governorates of Iraq